Ustad Feroz Gul was a Sindhi-language musician and composer.

Awards and recognition 
 Tamgha-e-Imtiaz (Medal of Distinction) in 2012 by the Government of Pakistan.

References

External links

1943 births
1996 deaths
Pakistani classical singers
Pakistani ghazal singers
Pakistani people of Rajasthani descent
20th-century Pakistani male singers
Recipients of Tamgha-e-Imtiaz